Discourse is a free and open-source Internet forum software. Features include support for threading, categorization and tagging of discussions, configurable access control, live updates, expanding link previews, infinite scrolling, and real-time notifications. It allows for a high level of customizability via its plugin architecture and its theming system. It was released on August 26, 2014, by its founders, Jeff Atwood, Robin Ward and Sam Saffron.

The client side application is written in EmberJS. The server side is written in Ruby on Rails and backed by a Postgres database and Redis cache. The source code is distributed under the GNU General Public License version 2.

Since its release, Discourse has been undergoing active development with over 40,000 commits as of March 2022.

Features

Categorization 
Similar discussions can be organized under categories. Admins can create categories, add category descriptions and logos, and control access to topics in the category. Discourse provides granular control over reading and writing permissions.

Discourse also supports sub-categorization or nested categories. Subcategories are categories in themselves so they can be controlled in the same manner as parent categories. The only difference is the parent-child relationship.

Tagging 
Tags are a lightweight alternative to categories, but they can also be used in conjunction. Unlike the heavy walls of categories, tags are nimble, flexible and lightweight.

Topics 
Conversations in Discourse are organized into topics. Users are able to create new topics or reply to existing ones. Categories and tags can be assigned to topics which makes them follow the security rules for those if applicable.

A topic consists of the initial post as well as any subsequent replies to it. Replies in Discourse follow a flat chronological order as opposed to being threaded. The Discourse core developers believe that threading replies is detrimental to the health of the overall discussion. Users can interact with each post independently. They can take actions such as reply, like, bookmark, quote or flag for moderation.

Trust levels 
According to the developers, "The user trust system is a fundamental cornerstone of Discourse". The trust level is a built-in feature that helps guide the progress of new members while they learn about the community. 

Newly registered users are sandboxed so they cannot accidentally hurt themselves or others while they learn about the community. As they become more experienced, by participating in the community, they are granted more rights and access to more features.
There are five different trust levels in Discourse; the new user trust level, the basic trust level, the member trust level, the regular trust level, and the leader trust level.

Discourse narrative bot 
Discobot is a customizable bot whose purpose is onboarding new users, interactively, to use many of the platform's features like bookmarking a topic, oneboxing links (embedded previews), adding emojis, using mentions, basic formatting, uploading images to a reply, flagging posts and using the search function.

Personal messages 
In addition to public and private topics, users on Discourse have the ability to send personal messages to other members in the community. Users receive notifications for personal messages and can add or remove members to a message at any time. Each user has a personal inbox that contains all of their sent and received messages.

Groups 
Admins can create and add members to groups in Discourse. Groups can be used to manage access to certain categories, group mentions as well as group messages.

When Discourse is installed, it creates automatic groups for administrators, moderators, staff, and the various trust levels. Custom groups can set to either public or private, Users can add themselves to a group or request to be added by the group owners. Users can also be automatically added to a group during signup based on their email address.

Editor 

Discourse features a rich-text editor, referred to as the composer. It supports plain-text, markdown, and HTML. The composer features a toolbar which includes formatting, quoting and upload buttons. The preview panel in the composer allows users to see a live preview of the post. It supports drag and drop image and file uploads. The composer supports OpenGraph and oEmbed. URLs from external websites that support those standards will automatically expand to provide a summary of the URL. One of the key features of the composer is its ability to save drafts prior to publishing them.

Certain actions in the composer are triggered based on user input. The "@" character creates a panel for mentioning other users. The "#" character creates a similar panel for categories and tags. The composer also features configurable and dismiss-able JIT educational panels with the goal of promoting civilized discussion.

Admin interface 
Discourse includes a feature-rich administration dashboard. It has various sections that allow admins to tweak many features in the software. The settings section includes a wide variety of controls which can be used to modify the display options and behavior of the software. It also includes easy-to-configure fields for meta information about the community.

The admin dashboard provides an overview of the health of the community. It displays charts that indicate trends in the number of signups alongside other community health metrics. There is also a dedicated section where admins can examine certain metrics over a specific period of time.

The localization section allows admins to change any text used in the interface to their liking.

User directory 
The "Users" page in Discourse serves as a leader-board with search functionality where a quick overview of members' activity is displayed. It includes statistics such as posts created, posts read, likes received and days visited for a given time frame. Users can be sorted according to any of those metrics. Admins can optionally add more metrics.

Plugins 
Discourse is extendable via plugins. Plugins create the ability to modify both the server and client sides of the application. Some examples of plugins include

 Discourse Math which adds support for math rendering.
 Chat integrations, which integrates Discourse with popular chat platforms.
 BBCode which adds support for BBtags.

The discourse team maintains a list of both official and community contributed plugins on the official support forum.

Themes 
The Discourse theme system allows admins to fully customize the client side application. Themes can modify the layout of pages, add new functionality and add additional styles to any element in the interface.

API 
Discourse is backed by a full REST API. The developers maintain a starting guide on the support forum as well as documentation for the API endpoints.

Security 
The developers welcome peer audits of the open source code and encourage reporting security issues. They maintain a vulnerability disclosure program at Hacker One.

DiscourseHub 
DiscourseHub is the official, open source Discourse application for Android and iOS devices. It allows users to keep track of new and unread posts and notifications across multiple Discourse sites. Real-time push notifications are native for officially hosted Discourse forums.

Server requirements 
The officially-provided, x86 64 Linux, Docker images are the supported method for installing Discourse. Discourse uses a custom "launcher" script to configure the containers.   

The Docker-based distribution includes the web server (which is based on nginx and Unicorn), database system (PostgreSQL), cache (Redis), and background processing services (Sidekiq).

Discourse requires an outgoing MTA and does not provide one itself.

Discourse also supports, but does not require, the ability to receive email. Discourse provides an optional Docker image for an incoming-only MTA, and supports receiving email via POP3 or IMAP.

History 
Co-founder Jeff Atwood announced in 2013 that Civilized Discourse Construction Kit, Inc. had obtained initial venture capital funding from First Round, Greylock, and SV Angel

In May 2017, he said in an interview that the company was generating approximately $120,000 per month. With the money, the company pays salaries for its full-time employees who maintain the software and develop new features. This is an example of an open source software business model where a company sells professional services to willing customers. As of March 2022, the developers shared that more than 3000 businesses or instances have chosen the official Discourse hosting which CDCK provides as Software as a service.

In August 2021, Civilized Discourse Construction Kit announced it had secured US$20 million in Series A Investment by Pace Capital and First Round Capital.

On February 1, 2023, Jeff Atwood stepped down as CEO and assumed the role of Executive Chairman. He was succeeded by Sam Saffron and Sarah Hawk.

Development and support 
The Discourse project is developed and maintained by the developers at Civilized Discourse Construction Kit, Inc. (CDCK).

See also 

 Comparison of Internet forum software
 List of blog comment hosting services
 List of mailing list software

References

External links 

 
 Official API documentation
 Official discussion forum
 

Internet forum software
Free Internet forum software
Free software programmed in Ruby
Free mailing list software
Mailing list software for Linux